This is a list of electoral district results for the 2003 New South Wales state election.

Results by electoral district

Albury

Auburn

Ballina

Bankstown

Barwon

Bathurst

Baulkham Hills

Bega

Blacktown

Bligh

Blue Mountains

Burrinjuck

Cabramatta

Camden

Campbelltown

Canterbury

Cessnock

Charlestown

Clarence

Coffs Harbour

Coogee

Cronulla

Davidson

Drummoyne

Dubbo

East Hills

Epping

Fairfield

Georges River

Gosford

Granville

Hawkesbury

Heathcote

Heffron

Hornsby

Illawarra

Keira

Kiama

Kogarah

Ku-ring-gai

Lachlan

Lake Macquarie

Lakemba

Lane Cove

Lismore

Liverpool

Londonderry

Macquarie Fields

Maitland

Manly

Maroubra

Marrickville

Menai

Miranda

Monaro

Mount Druitt

Mulgoa

Murray-Darling

Murrumbidgee

Myall Lakes

Newcastle

North Shore

Northern Tablelands

Orange

Oxley

Parramatta

Peats

Penrith

Pittwater

Port Jackson

Port Macquarie

Port Stephens

Riverstone

Rockdale

Ryde

Smithfield

South Coast

Southern Highlands

Strathfield

Swansea

Tamworth 

Tony Windsor resigned in 2001 and John Cull won the seat at the resulting by-election.

The Entrance

The Hills

Tweed

Upper Hunter

Vaucluse

Wagga Wagga

Wakehurst

Wallsend

Wentworthville

Willoughby

Wollongong

Wyong

See also
 Candidates of the 2003 New South Wales state election
 Members of the New South Wales Legislative Assembly, 2003–2007

References

2003